East Bokaro Coalfield is located in Bokaro district in the Indian state of Jharkhand.

Overview
In 1917, L.S.S. O’Malley described the coalfields in the upper reaches of the Damodar as follows: “Near the western boundary of Jharia field is that of Bokaro, covering , with an estimated content of 1,500 million tons; close by… is the Ramgarh field , in which, however, coal is believed to be of inferior quality.

The Coalfield

Location
The Bokaro coalfield lies between 23°45' and 23°50' North latitude and 85°30' and 86°03' East longitude. Bokaro West and Bokaro East are two subdivisions of the field, separated almost in the middle by Lugu Hill (height ).

Bokaro River passes through the West Bokaro and East Bokaro coalfields.

Reserves
Geolological reserves in East Bokaro Coalfield in million tonnes as on 1/4/2010:

Projects

Transport
In 1927, the Central India Coalfields Railway opened the Barkakana–Netaji S.C.Bose Gomoh line. It was extended to Daltonganj in 1929. Later these lines were amalgamated with East Indian Railway.

References

Coalfields of India
Mining in Jharkhand
Hazaribagh district